Celli is a surname. Notable people with the surname include:

Angelo Celli (1857-1914), Italian physician
Antonio Celli (1595–1645), Italian Roman Catholic bishop
Camus Celli, American songwriter, record producer and entrepreneur
Claudio Maria Celli (born 1941), Italian Roman Catholic archbishop
Enzo Celli (born 1972), Italian contemporary dancer and choreographer
Giorgio Celli (1935–2011), Italian politician
Gregorio Celli (1225–1343), Italian Roman Catholic priest
Joseph Celli (born 1944), American musician and composer
Luca Celli (born 1979), Italian cyclist
Oscar Celli Gerbasi (1946-2016), Venezuelan politician
Ottorino Celli (born 1980), Italian cyclist
Paola Celli (born 1967), Italian swimmer
Rita Celli (born c. 1969), Canadian radio journalist
Teresa Celli (born 1924), American actress
Vincenzo Celli (1900–1988), Italian-American ballet dancer and choreographer